Garnachas (alternatively garnaches) are a traditional dish composed of fried corn tortillas topped with refried beans, shredded cabbage, cheese, and other garnishes.  Garnaches are especially popular in Belize, where they are made with corn, beans, and cheese being the traditional makeup, and Guatemala, being available in most restaurants as a common appetizer.

See also
 Tostada

References

Belizean cuisine
Tortilla-based dishes
Legume dishes
Guatemalan cuisine